Recherchebreen is a glacier in Wedel Jarlsberg Land at Spitsbergen, Svalbard. It is located in a valley between Martinfjella and Observatoriefjellet, and debouches into Recherche Fjord. Among its tributary glaciers are Foldnutfonna, Varderyggfonna, Dollfusbreen, Ramondbreen and Bjørnbreen.

References

Glaciers of Spitsbergen